The State Law Building, at 50 Ann Street, Brisbane, Queensland, Australia, contains offices of the Attorney-General of Queensland and other government organisations.

History 
It was completed in 1977 as Comalco House and featured aluminium external cladding (as Comalco was an aluminium manufacturer). It was refurbished in 1993 when the aluminium cladding was removed. Both the original building and the refurbishment was designed by local firm Conrad Gargett & Partners.

Following its complete refurbishment in 1995, the State Law Building became an iconic feature of the city, widely referred to by locals and the media as "Gotham City", "Gotham Tower" or the "Batman Building", for its perceived resemblance to the architectural style of the fictional American city appearing in American comic books published by DC Comics.

Geography 
The State Law Building is close to the Queen Elizabeth II Courts of Law (which includes the Supreme Court of Queensland and the District Court of Queensland), as well as the Commonwealth Law Courts.

Photos of the State Law Building

References 

Government buildings completed in 1977
Office buildings in Brisbane
Skyscrapers in Brisbane
Ann Street, Brisbane
Skyscraper office buildings in Australia